Alvin Nitura Morada (born 12 April 1997) is a Filipino badminton player. He was selected for the Filipino badminton squad that competed in the 2020 Badminton Asia Team Championships.

Career 
In 2015, Morada and his partner Aries Delos Santos were runners-up at the 2015 Iran Fajr International. He was also runner-up at the 2019 Sydney International with Peter Gabriel Magnaye.

In 2022, under the coach of Rosman Razak, Morada was able to compete in two categories, in the men's and mixed doubles. He won two titles in both men's doubles and mixed doubles at the 2022 Cameroon and also Benin International.

Achievements

ASEAN School Games
Mixed doubles

BWF International Challenge/Series (5 titles, 4 runners-up)
Men's doubles

Mixed doubles

  BWF International Challenge tournament
  BWF International Series tournament
  BWF Future Series tournament

BWF Junior International (2 titles, 1 runners-up) 
Boys' doubles

Mixed doubles

  BWF Junior International Grand Prix tournament
  BWF Junior International Challenge tournament
  BWF Junior International Series tournament
  BWF Junior Future Series tournament

References

External links 
 

1997 births
Living people
Sportspeople from Quezon City
Filipino male badminton players
Competitors at the 2017 Southeast Asian Games
Competitors at the 2019 Southeast Asian Games
Southeast Asian Games competitors for the Philippines